Deltophalonia is a genus of moths which belongs to the family Tortricidae.

Species
Deltophalonia chlidonibrya Razowski & Becker, 2003
Deltophalonia deltochlaena (Meyrick, 1930)
Deltophalonia embrithopa (Meyrick, 1927)
Deltophalonia huanuci Razowski & Wojtusiak, 2010
Deltophalonia indanzae Razowski & Becker, 2007
Deltophalonia obscura Razowski & Wojtusiak, 2008
Deltophalonia sucuma Razowski & Becker, 2010
Deltophalonia termasia Razowski & Wojtusiak, 2009

See also
List of Tortricidae genera

References

 , 2005: World catalogue of insects volume 5 Tortricidae.
 , 2011: Diagnoses and remarks on genera of Tortricidae, 2: Cochylini (Lepidoptera: Tortricidae). Shilap Revista de Lepidopterologia 39 (156): 397–414.
 , 2003, Polskie Pismo Ent. 72: 157
 , 2009: Tortricidae (Lepidoptera) from the mountains of Ecuador and remarks on their geographical distribution. Part IV. Eastern Cordillera. Acta Zoologica Cracoviensia 51B (1-2): 119–187. doi:10.3409/azc.52b_1-2.119-187. Full article:  .
 , 2010: Tortricidae (Lepidoptera) from Peru. Acta Zoologica Cracoviensia 53B (1-2): 73-159. . Full article:  .
 , 2013: Accessions to the fauna of Neotropical Tortricidae (Lepidoptera). Acta Zoologica Cracoviensia, 56 (1): 9-40. Full article:  .

External links
tortricidae.com

Cochylini
Tortricidae genera